The Iraq women's national under-17 football team is the female representative football team for under-17, under-16 and under-15 competitions and it is controlled by Iraq Football Association.

Competitions record

FIFA U-17 Women's World Cup record

*Draws include knockout matches decided on penalty kicks.

AFC U-16 Women's Championship record

*Draws include knockout matches decided on penalty kicks.

Arab U-17 Women's Cup

Matches

Recent results and fixtures

Players

Current squad
 The following 18 players were called up for the 2017 AFC U-16 Women's Championship qualification:
 Match date: 25 August - 3 September 2016
Caps and goals correct as of: 3 September 2016, after the match against .

Recent call-ups

See also
Iraq women's national football team
Iraq men's national football team
Iraq men's national under-23 football team
Iraq men's national under-20 football team
Iraq men's national under-17 football team

References

External links
Official website
Official Iraq national football team on FIFA.com

Asian women's national under-17 association football teams
Arabic women's national under-17 association football teams